Taubash-Badrakovo (Tawbaş-Baźraq) is a rural locality (a village) in Uchpilinsky Selsoviet, Dyurtyulinsky District, Bashkortostan, Russia. The population was 142 as of 2010. There are 5 streets.

Geography 
Taubash-Badrakovo is located 30 km northeast of Dyurtyuli (the district's administrative centre) by road. Novobadrakovo is the nearest rural locality.

References 

Rural localities in Dyurtyulinsky District